Orazio Querci (1875, Rome –1970) was  an Italian entomologist mainly interested in butterflies.
Querci established a  butterfly dealership  in Florence.

He supplied World butterflies to many museums including the Natural History Museum, London , the Museum of Philadelphia (via  R.C. Williams),  the Museum of Barcelona  and the Bocage Museum (National Museum of Natural History), Lisbon, Portugal . The Museo Civico di Zoologia holds a collection of Apennine Lepidoptera (" Querci-Romei" collection) and the Zoological Museum of the Sapienza University of Rome holds further specimens. Querci also supplied European butterflies to Roger Verity. Orazio Querci collected extensively in Spain and Portugal also in Cuba.

Works
Verity, R. & Querci, O. (1923): An annotated list of the races and seasonal polymorphism of the Grypocera and of the Rhopalocera of Peninsular Italy. Ent. Rec. 35 (Supplement)

References
Cesare Conci and Roberto Poggi (1996) ''Iconography of Italian Entomologists, with essential biographical data. Memorie della Società entomologica Italiana, 75: 159–382.

Italian entomologists
1875 births
1970 deaths